Fredrik Lindström (born 27 June 1963 in Eskilstuna, Södermanland County) is a Swedish comedian, film director and presenter.

He played drums for the heavy metal band CRYSTAL PRIDE in the early 1980s.

In the 2000s, Lindström became a household name in Sweden through his documentary series Värsta språket about the Swedish language at Sveriges Television. Lindström has written several books that served as a basis for the series as well as historic linguistics in the Swedish language. They have the same kind of approach, mixing informality with information derived from the author's linguistics background.

Lindström's first encounter with the Swedish audience was on the radio show Hassan, on which he made prank calls to random people pretending to be different imaginary people, often with some kind of subtle disturbance that made the conversation farcical. The show aired on P3 for several seasons in the 1990s.

Since 2010, he has taken Björn Hellberg's role as the referee, in one of the most popular Television-Quizzes in Sweden ever, På spåret, which largely is a contest in geography, but also includes history, linguistics, sports and various subjects.

A few years later, after various smaller appearances as a stand-up comedian, he directed two Swedish featured films in the comedy/drama genre; these featured well-known Swedish actors such as Mikael Persbrandt and Magnus Härenstam.

Discography

Films
 Vuxna människor, 1999 (Adult Behaviour, lit. Adult People.)
 Känd från TV, 2001 (Recognized from TV)

Documentaries
 Harry Victor, 2001
 Värsta språket (The worst language)
 Svenska dialektmysterier (Swedish dialect mysteries)
 Världens modernaste land (The world's most modern country)

Radio shows
 Hassan, early to mid 1990s
 På Minuten, (the Swedish version of the BBC radio game show Just a Minute)

TV shows
 Tommy på Skitiga duken on ZTV (Tommy at Skitiga duken)
 Ingesson
 Pangbulle (Bang bun)
 Pentagon
 c/o Segemyhr
 Detta har hänt (This has happened)

Music
Crystal Pride

CDs
 www.matapa.nu, at Mosebacke in  Stockholm during the spring of 1999 ( www.foodmonkey.nu)

Books
 Världens dåligaste språk ("The World's  Language"), 2000
 Vad gör alla superokända människor hela dagarna? ("What Do All the Super-unknown People Do All day?"), 2001
 Jordens smartaste ord ("The smartest words on earth"), 2002
 Vem är Björn och vem är Benny? ("Which one is Björn [Ulvaeus] and which one is Benny [Andersson]?"), 2004
 Jag är en sån som bara vill ligga med dig ("I'm the Kind Who Only Wants to Sleep With You"), 2005
 Svitjods undergång och Sveriges födelse ("The Fall of Svitjod and the Birth of Sweden") with Henrik Lindström, 2006
 Evolutionen och jag kommer inte överens ("Evolution and I don't get along"), 2010
 När börjar det riktiga livet? ("When does the real life start?"), 2011

Prizes and awards
 1999 – Kvällspostens Edvardspris (Edvard prize awarded by the evening edition of the daily newspaper Expressen)
 2001 – Karamelodiktstipendiat[6] (scholarship awarded yearly from a fund managed by the Royal Swedish Music Academy)
 2002 – Tage Danielsson-priset (Tage Danielsson prize, awarded in memory of Swedish poet, writer, film director, actor and comedian Tage Danielsson) 
 2002 – Mensapriset (Mensa award, awarded by Mensa Sweden, the Swedish chapter of the international Mensa organization) 
 2002 – Månadens stockholmare i maj (Stockholm personality of the month, awarded by The City of Stockholm)
 2003 – Aftonbladets TV-pris för bästa manliga TV-personlighet (Best TV male personality prize, awarded by the daily newspaper Aftonbladet)
 2003 – Uppsala universitets och Studentbokhandeln AB:s Disapris (Disa prize, awarded by Uppsala University and the Student Bookstore in recognition of notable contributions to popular writing)
 2003 – Nationalencyklopedins Kunskapspriset (The Knowledge Prize, awarded by the National Encyclopedia of Sweden)
 2006 – Årets bok om svensk historia för "Svitjods undergång och Sveriges födelse" (Historic Book of the Year, awarded by the online newspaper "Svesnk Historia", Swedish History)
 2006 – Aftonbladets TV-pris för bästa manliga TV-personlighet (Best TV male personality prize, awarded by the daily newspaper Aftonbladet)
 2009 – Natur & Kulturs Kulturpris (Culture Prize, awarded by the Natur & Kultur foundation)

References

External links
Crystal Pride

Fredrik Lindström i Svensk mediedatabas
Författarpresentation från Albert Bonniers Förlag

Living people
1963 births
Sommar (radio program) hosts
Swedish comedians
Swedish male writers
Linguists from Sweden
Uppsala University alumni
People from Eskilstuna